Guanine nucleotide-binding protein subunit beta-5 is a protein that in humans is encoded by the GNB5 gene. Alternatively spliced transcript variants encoding different isoforms exist.

Function 

Heterotrimeric guanine nucleotide-binding proteins (G proteins), which integrate signals between receptors and effector proteins, are composed of an alpha, a beta, and a gamma subunit. These subunits are encoded by families of related genes. This gene encodes a beta subunit. Beta subunits are important regulators of alpha subunits, as well as of certain signal transduction receptors and effectors.

GNB5 has been shown to differentially control RGS protein stability and membrane anchor binding, and therefore is involved in the control of complex neuronal G protein signaling pathways.

Interactions 

GNB5 has been shown to interact with:
 GNG7,
 GNG13,
 RGS7 and 
 RGS9.

References

Further reading